John Lonergan (April 7, 1839–August 6, 1902) was a captain in the Union Army and a Medal of Honor recipient for his actions in the Battle of Gettysburg during the American Civil War.

Medal of Honor citation
Rank and organization: Captain, Company A, 13th Vermont Infantry. Place and date: At Gettysburg, Pa., July 2, 1863. Entered service at: Burlington, Vt. Birth: Ireland. Date of issue: October 28, 1893.

Citation:

Gallantry in the recapture of 4 guns and the capture of 2 additional guns from the enemy; also the capture of a number of prisoners.

See also

List of Medal of Honor recipients for the Battle of Gettysburg
List of American Civil War Medal of Honor recipients: G–L

References

External links

Vermont in the Civil War
The Nationalist Article

1839 births
1902 deaths
2nd Vermont Brigade
American Civil War recipients of the Medal of Honor
American expatriates in Canada
Irish-born Medal of Honor recipients
Irish emigrants to the United States (before 1923)
Irish soldiers in the United States Army
People from County Tipperary
United States Army Medal of Honor recipients
United States Army officers